Thomas Parker (1753–1820), was an American soldier.

Biography
Parker was born in Frederick County, Virginia, in 1753. He was a captain during the American Revolution, participating in several battles with the 9th Virginia Regiment.

Parker was lieutenant-colonel of the 8th Infantry Regiment in 1799, and in June 1800 was mustered out of service. He was appointed colonel of the 12th Infantry Regiment in March 1812, commissioned brigadier general in March 1813, and resigned in November of the next year. He died in Frederick County on 24 January 1820.

Notes

References

1753 births
1820 deaths
United States Army generals
People from Virginia